Francis Kemp (1 July 1891 – 15 February 1967) was a British sports shooter. He competed in two events at the 1912 Summer Olympics.

References

1891 births
1967 deaths
British male sport shooters
Olympic shooters of Great Britain
Shooters at the 1912 Summer Olympics
Sportspeople from London